is a Japanese ski jumper. He competed in the normal hill and large hill events at the 1988 Winter Olympics.

References

1959 births
Living people
Japanese male ski jumpers
Olympic ski jumpers of Japan
Ski jumpers at the 1988 Winter Olympics
Sportspeople from Hokkaido